Connecticut elected its members April 29, 1829 after the term began but before Congress convened.

See also 
 1828 and 1829 United States House of Representatives elections
 List of United States representatives from Connecticut

Notes

References 

 

1829
Connecticut
United States House of Representatives